The Union of Citizens of Georgia (also known as the Citizens' Union of Georgia or Georgian Citizens' Union) was a centre-left political party established by Eduard Shevardnadze, Communist leader of the Georgian SSR from 1972-1985 and then President of Georgia from 1992–2003 and David Chantladze, former General Trade Representative of the Soviet Union to Czechoslovakia. It was established in the mid-1990s as a vehicle for modernising politicians. It became the majority grouping in the Georgian parliament following the parliamentary elections of November 1995, with Shevardnadze winning the presidency at the same time.

Although the Citizens' Union attracted a number of talented young reformers, including Mikhail Saakashvili, Zurab Zhvania and Nino Burjanadze, it eventually fell victim to Georgia's endemic corruption and Shevardnadze's increasing use of electoral manipulation. In September 2001, Saakashvili resigned from Shevardnadze's government and party on the grounds that corruption had penetrated to the very centre of the Georgian government and that Shevardnadze lacked the will to deal with it. The controversy eventually led to the Citizens' Union splitting into three opposing factions, with alleged corruption among senior party members at the centre of the dispute. In June 2002, Zhvania left the Citizens' Union to set up his own party. Parliamentary Speaker Nino Burjanadze also left the Citizens' Union to join forces with Zhvania and, eventually, with Saakashvili. By June 2003, five opposition parties had established a United National Movement to provide a focus for opposition to the Citizens' Union.

The Citizens' Union was at the centre of the political crisis of November 2003, when parliamentary elections held on November 2 produced results that were widely regarded as rigged. On November 23, massive popular demonstrations forced Shevardnadze to resign. The election results were subsequently annulled and fresh elections were scheduled for 2004. The party was a consultative member of the Socialist International.

References

Defunct political parties in Georgia (country)
Former member parties of the Socialist International
Social democratic parties
Social democratic parties in Georgia (country)
Centre-left parties in Georgia (country)